The 1946 Auburn Tigers football team was an American football team that represented Auburn University in the Southeastern Conference (SEC) during the 1946 college football season. It was Auburn's 55th season of intercollegiate football and its 14th season as a member of the SEC. The Tigers were led by head coach Carl M. Voyles, in his third year at Auburn, and compiled a record of four wins and six losses (4–6 overall, 1–5 in the SEC). They were outscored by a total of 210 to 132.

Auburn back Travis Tidwell led the nation in total offense with 1,715 yards -- 772 rushing and 943 passing. He also led the nation with 79 pass completions and ranked seventh in rushing yards.

The team played its home games at the Cramton Bowl in Montgomery, Alabama (three games), Legion Field in Birmingham (two games), and Auburn Stadium in Auburn (one game).

Schedule

References

Auburn
Auburn Tigers football seasons
Auburn Tigers football